NDTV 24x7 is a 24-hour English-language television news channel based in New Delhi, India.

History

Until about the end of the 1980s, like most of the world, television broadcasting was not in private hands in India. In the news production area there were some private stringers for Doordarshan. The freelancers were given assignments to cover news and later they were also involved in current affairs programmes and documentaries.

1988: New Delhi Television was set up by Prannoy Roy – a former professor of economics at the University of Delhi – and his wife and business partner Radhika Roy. The Roys are today known for helping to break the Indian government's grip on television news.

New Delhi Television started producing The World This Week, a highly successful weekly news magazine covering world news and entertainment for Doordarshan. NDTV's coverage of Tiananmen Square and the fall of the Berlin Wall was path-breaking in Indian television reporting and gave it brand recognition. NDTV quickly established as a credible private news provider. NDTV catered their programmes to Doordarshan and later for CNN and BBC. Unlike the television wing of PTI and United News of India, this private news production enterprise was largely successful.

1989: NDTV produces India's first televised coverage of general elections results with analysis.

1995: NDTV became India's first private producer of the national news with telecast of "Tonight" on Doordarshan.

Joint venture 
1996: Since the Indian legislation required a majority Indian ownership for news broadcasters, STAR commissions NDTV to provide supply news content to STAR News.

1998: STAR Network sets up the STAR News channel, India's first 24-hour news channel [with NDTV] to coincide with the general elections. STAR News (English/Hindi) made a big impact on behalf of the global Murdoch network, winning larger audiences in India than longer-established broadcasters such as CNN and BBC. Although STAR News had the STAR platform, the news was not produced in-house. NDTV provided all the news material- both in Hindi and English - including its presentation and packaging for STAR. By this mutually beneficial partnership NDTV could reach homes of affluent Indians through the STAR platform, while STAR could benefit from the gravitas of a serious news channel.

As part of the STAR bouquet of channels, STAR News remained dependent on its relationship with Murdoch and vulnerable to changes in STAR's strategy. As the end of its contract with STAR approached, NDTV considered a number of possibilities to broaden its appeal and its revenue. STAR had already been downplaying NDTV's profile. Its contract with NDTV did not give STAR editorial control, and STAR's management were uneasy when India government criticised NDTV for its reporting of the Gujarat riots in 2002.

New channels 
2003: With the end of its contract with STAR, NDTV launched its own news channels in English (NDTV 24x7) and Hindi (NDTV India). Star TV was keen to renew NDTV's contract but was no longer willing to give it full editorial control. STAR retained the STAR News brand, but channel continued only in Hindi. Media observers expected that NDTV would struggle to survive on its own. After much speculation about its future, it announced a distribution partnership with Sony Entertainment Television's One World Alliance. This alliance with Sony gave NDTV a strong base from which to establish a new profile.

NDTV had been a success story in terms of influence, but its recent criticism of the Indian government has led to the depletion of its viewship. STAR's decision [after it ended its contract with NDTV] to concentrate on Hindi news bulletins and to drop its English service is also a significant indicator of the balance between profitability and influence in the crowded Indian television news market. NDTV has been on a cost-cutting spree for several quarters now, as it seeks to stay relevant in a competitive market.

2005: NDTV launched business news channel NDTV Profit.

Distribution network
NDTV channels have an overseas audience among the Indian diaspora in the U.S., Canada, the U.K., Asia Pacific, the Middle East and South Africa, thanks to deals with satellite operators, such as Sky and DirecTV. To accelerate the global push, NDTV formed a joint venture with a subsidiary of Kuala Lumpur's Astro All Asia Network, taking a 20% stake. In 2006, it launched: Astro Awani, a Bahasa-language channel in Indonesia.

NDTV 24x7 broadcasts in the UK on the Sky (Channel 509) and Virgin Media (Channel 621) platforms, in the USA on the Dish Network, Spectrum and Xfinity platform, in South Africa on DSTV, in Canada available via a partnership with Asian Television Network, in Australia on the Vision Asia and Fetch TV (Under Taj Mahal Pack and Basic Pack) platform, Singapore on Singtel's Singtel TV (Between Since 2008 to 2011, Return From 2015), Starhub TV (Since 2013) platform and in Sri Lanka on Dialog TV & Peo TV

Controversies

Prevention of Corruption Act case 
The CBI had filed a criminal conspiracy case against NDTV managing director Roy in 1998 for alleging fraud in Doordarshan upgrade. In July 2013, Roy and NDTV were cleared by the courts and found not-guilty of all charges involving cases filed against Roy by the CBI under Section 120-B of the Indian Penal Code (IPC) for criminal conspiracy and under the Prevention of Corruption Act, 1988.

NDTV, through its foreign subsidiaries, is alleged to have violated Indian tax and corporate laws. NDTV has denied these allegations.

Radia tapes controversy 

Radia tapes relate to telephonic conversations tapped  by Income tax department, which include conversation of NDTV Journalist Barkha Dutt.

The transcripts of the tapes, referred to the lobbying activity against the reappointment of Dayanidhi Maran to the post of Union IT and Communications minister in the UPA tenure in Indian government.

 Conversation with NDTV journalist Barkha Dutt at 0948 IST.
 In a later conversation at 1047 IST, Barkha says that it (conveying the message to Congress(ruling government in the year)) was 'not a problem' and that she would talk to Ghulam (Nabi Azad) (Indian politician and Congress member).

The Sunday Guardian's allegations
The Sunday Guardian ran a story which exposed the NDTV's financial misdemeanours and malpractices in connivance with ICICI Bank. It provides details of how NDTV's major stakeholders raised funds by misdeclaration of the value of shares in NDTV. NDTV has denied the allegations and the NDTV CEO replied to the Sunday Guardian along with the threat of "criminal defamation". On 5 June 2017, the House of Prannoy Roy was raided by NIA and CBI.

Foreign Exchange Management Act violation 
On 19 November 2015 the ED served ₹2,030 crore (US$280 million) notice to NDTV for alleged violations under the Foreign Exchange Management Act, however the company said it has been advised that the allegations are not "legally tenable".

Income tax cases 
The "Income Tax Appellate Tribunal" (ITAT) has upheld an income tax department finding that promoters of NDTV used their own shell companies to round-trip investments of ₹642 crore (US$90 million) during 2009-10, making them liable for recovery of tax and penalty.

The Delhi bench of the Income Tax Appellate Tribunal which functioned under the Ministry of Law upheld the findings of the department held the company liable for reassessment of taxation with penalty. According to the findings, the company had allegedly colluded with NBCUniversal, a subsidiary of General Electric in a complex money laundering scheme for evading taxation of what was noted to be relatively small amount of funds relative to the size of the companies.

Securities and Exchange Board of India violation 
In September 2018, Roy and his wife Radhika were issued show cause notice by Securities and Exchange Board of India for violation of insider trading regulations though their company NDTV downplayed the notices stating they were seeking legal advice on the issue. Earlier that year, in the month March they were fined Rs 3 lac each by SEBI for disclosure lapses.

Securities and Exchange Board of India barred Prannoy Roy and his wife Radhika Roy from accessing the securities market for 2 years after an investigation revealed that they concealed material info from shareholders regarding loan agreements and hence they cannot hold management positions in NDTV board.

Central Bureau of Investigation case 

 In 2017, the Central Bureau of Investigation (CBI) lodged a case against the company on allegations that it had defrauded ICICI Bank, and the offices of the company and residence of the founders, the Roys were raided by the bureau. The case was lodged on the basis of a complaint by a stockbroker Sanjay Dutt supported by the retracted Sunday Guardian article. It was noted that ICICI Bank itself considered the company to have returned the loan within an year and had not received any details of the case. The raids received condemnation and the CBI was accused of being under pressure from the government to act against the news broadcaster.
 In August 2019, the Central Bureau of Investigation filed a fresh case against Prannoy Roy, his wife Radhika Roy and former NDTV CEO Vikram Chandra for violating FDI rules and routing of tainted money of unknown public servants through shell firms.

Awards
 Critics Award for Pioneering Work in Programming at the 1998 Screen Awards
 Best English News Channel of Asia in 2005 at the Asian Television Awards
 Best English News Channel in 2005 and 2006 at the Indian Television Academy Awards

See also
 NDTV
 NDTV India

References

External links
 

NDTV Group
24-hour television news channels in India
English-language television stations in India
Television stations in Delhi
Television stations in New Delhi
Mass media companies based in Delhi
Indian companies established in 2003
Mass media companies established in 2003
Television channels and stations established in 2003